Jordan is an unincorporated community in Linn County, in the U.S. state of Oregon. It lies along Oregon Route 226, southeast of Stayton and about halfway between Scio and Lyons.

Thomas Creek flows through Jordan. A covered bridge, the Jordan Bridge, built in 1937, was a  Howe truss span that crossed the creek here. Dismantled in 1985, its timbers were moved to Stayton and reassembled in that city's Pioneer Park.

The community was once the site of the Monastery of Our Lady of Jordan.

References

External links
 Jordan Covered Bridge
 Historic photo of Trappist School in Jordan from the Salem Public Library

Unincorporated communities in Linn County, Oregon
Unincorporated communities in Oregon